Henry Jervis-White-Jervis (1825 – 22 September 1881) was a British army officer and a Conservative politician who sat in the House of Commons from 1859 to 1880.

Jervis-White-Jervis was the third son of Sir Henry Meredith Jervis White-Jervis, 2nd baronet and his wife Marian Campbell daughter of William Campbell of Fairfield, Ayrshire. He was educated at Harrow School and at the Royal Military Academy, Woolwich. He joined the Royal Artillery as 2nd lieutenant in December 1844. He became 1st Lieutenant in  1846 and captain in September 1853. He was employed on special service under the Board of Ordnance in the United States in 1855

Jervis-White-Jervis stood for parliament unsuccessfully at Harwich in 1857. At a by-election in March 1859 he was elected Member of Parliament for Harwich.

Jervis-White-Jervis continued his military career and  held various appointments dealing  with the armaments of the service until January 1866 when he became Brevet-Major. In December 1867 he became lieutenant-colonel.  He authored several books including Manual of Field Operations, History of Corfu and of the Ionian Islands, The Enfield Rifle, and Our Engines of War.

In February 1863 Jervis-White-Jervis was elected deputy chairman of the Great Eastern Railway with specific responsibilities for chairing the stores and Traffic committees within that organisation. In August 1865 Jervis-White-Jervis issued an appeal raising concerns about the management of the railway. This prompted an internal investigation and in a board meeting at the end of the month, an absent Jervis-White-Jervis was replaced by William Shaw as deputy chairman. The internal investigation concluded that many of Jervis-White-Jervis's concerns were relevant and in a meeting in January the following years many of the directors were duly replaced (by members of the investigating committee). However Jervis-White-Jervis did not escape unscathed being subject to a motion of censure.

He remained in parliament until 1880.

Jervis-White-Jervis died at the age of 56. (1881)

Jervis-White-Jervis married in 1855  Lucy Cobbold, daughter of John Chevalier Cobbold M.P. for Ipswich and had several children.

References

External links

1825 births
1881 deaths
Conservative Party (UK) MPs for English constituencies
UK MPs 1857–1859
UK MPs 1859–1865
UK MPs 1865–1868
UK MPs 1868–1874
UK MPs 1874–1880
Royal Artillery officers
British non-fiction writers
People educated at Harrow School
Graduates of the Royal Military Academy, Woolwich
British male writers
Directors of the Great Eastern Railway
Male non-fiction writers